The 2013 All-Ireland Intermediate Hurling Championship was the 29th staging of the All-Ireland hurling championship since its establishment by the Gaelic Athletic Association in 1961. The championship began on 26 May 2012 and ended on 1 September 2012.

Clare were the defending champions, however, they were defeated in the provincial final. Tipperary won the title following a 3–13 to 1–17 defeat of Kilkenny in the final.

Team summaries

Results

Leinster Intermediate Hurling Championship

Munster Intermediate Hurling Championship

All-Ireland Intermediate Hurling Championship

Statistics

Top scorers

Overall

Single game

Scoring

First goal of the championship
David Butler for Tipperary against Limerick (Munster quarter-final)
Widest winning margin: 12 points
Tipperary 2-20 - 1-11 Limerick (Munster quarter-final)
Most goals in a match:  5
Tipperary 3-18 - 2-16 Cork (Munster semi-final)
Most points in a match: 37
Tipperary 1-18 - 0-17 Clare (Munster final)
Most goals by one team in a match: 3
Kilkenny 3-20 - 2-14 Wexford (Leinster final)
Tipperary 3-18 - 2-16 Cork (Munster semi-final)
Waterford 3-9 - 1-19 Clare (Munster semi-final)
Tipperary 3-13 - 1-17 Kilkenny (All-Ireland final)
 Highest aggregate score: 49
Kilkenny 3-20 - 2-14 Wexford (Leinster final)
Tipperary 3-18 - 2-16 Cork (Munster semi-final)
Most goals scored by a losing team: 3
Waterford 3-9 - 1-19 Clare (Munster semi-final

References

Intermediate
All-Ireland Intermediate Hurling Championship